The Center of Puerto Rican Art (Spanish: Centro de Arte Puertorriqueño, CAP) was a print workshop and exhibition venue established by Lorenzo Homar, Rafael Tufiño, José Antonio Torres Martinó, Félix Rodríguez Báez and Julio Rosado del Valle in 1950. The workshop was inspired by the Mexican Taller de Gráfica Popular and appealed to populist ideas about art for the masses.

Exhibition and portfolios 
Despite the short life of the CAP, many young and important Puerto Rican artists were involved in the workshop. The center evolved out of the artistic collaborations going on at the Puerto Rican Division of Community Education and the earlier Estudio 17. The prints produced at the CAP appealed to the masses through populist and nationalist messages. They held an exhibition in 1951 titled The Puerto Rican Print that included a statement of the organization’s goals. A portfolio of prints were published and available for purchase along with the exhibition. The CAP closed in 1952, but its efforts contributed to a growing printmaking culture in Puerto Rico. Artists from the CAP continued to collaborate and produce portfolios, such as Lorenzo Homar and Rafael Tufiño’s 1953 Portafolio de Plenas.

Citations 

Puerto Rican culture
Latin American art